The Mexico City Congress (ALCDMX) is the legislative branch of  government of Mexico City. Between 1988 and 1993, it was known as the Assembly of Representatives of the Federal District, during which period it had reduced powers with respect to the current body.

Composition
The Legislative Assembly consists of 66 deputies, of which 40 are elected by the first-past-the-post system or FPP and 26 by proportional representation or PR.

III Legislative Assembly
From 2003 to 2006.

IV Legislative Assembly
From 2006 to 2009.

VI Legislative Assembly
From 2012 to 2015.

VII Legislative Assembly
From 2015 to 2018.

History
In 1987, the federal government decided the creation of an Assembly of Representatives of the Federal District. This assembly, elected by the inhabitants of the Federal District, had limited legislative powers. Nonetheless, it was the first time since 1928 that the inhabitants of the Federal District recovered some oversight over their local affairs. Eventually, in 1993, full home rule was granted to the Federal District by the federal government, with the creation of an elected Head of Government of the Federal District and a great expansion of the legislative powers of the Assembly of Representatives of the Federal District, which was also renamed the Legislative Assembly.

The first session of the Legislative Assembly of the Federal District ran from 1997 to 2000.  Since its installation the Legislative Assembly has been renewed three times.

See also
2006 Mexican Federal District election

References

External links
Legislative Assembly website

Mexico City
Legislatures of Mexican states
Mexico City